Created on May 6, 1985, following the purchase and merger of the Kellogg Evening News and the North Idaho Press by the Hagadone Media Group, The Shoshone News-Press is the primary media outlet of Shoshone County, Idaho. It is owned and operated by the Hagadone Media Group and is part of the Idaho Hagadone News Network. 

The Shoshone News-Press distributes an afternoon print product twice a week on Tuesdays and Fridays. They also provide daily and breaking news stories on their website and social media platforms, such as Facebook and Instagram. 

Their current office in Osburn is home to one of two audio recording studios in the Idaho Hagadone News Network- primarily used to record North Idaho Now podcasts.

History 
The News-Press' original office in Uptown Kellogg was destroyed on the morning of Thursday, Sept. 24, 2010, after being burned down by an arsonist. 
The Kellogg Evening News had been published since 1886, and the Wallace-based North Idaho press had been published since 1896.

References

External links 
 The Hagadone Corporation

Newspapers published in Idaho
Shoshone County, Idaho
Daily newspapers published in the United States